The Carved Lions (1895) is a book by British author Mary Louisa Molesworth (Mrs. Molesworth).  The book was first published by Macmillan and Company, London.

Plot
The story features the interaction between the children of the household and the carved lions featured, who come to life and take care of them.

External links
 

1895 British novels
19th-century British children's literature
British children's novels
1890s children's books
British children's books